Radiant Future Records is a British independent record label and home to one-time Sparks bassist Martin Gordon, Jet, Radio Stars, John's Children, the Blue Meanies and related artists. The label began operations in 2002 with the release of a live recording from Gordon's alumni Jet, Johns Children and Radio Stars, and releases one or two albums per year with a focus upon 'clever twisted pop which rocks', to quote Rolling Stone magazine.

Recent releases include a live Radio Stars album from the 1970s and Gordon's six solo releases in the Mammal Trilogy series. The final instalment Include Me Out was released in 2013. Since then, three projects have been released: an album of Gilbert and Sullivan material Gilbert Gordon & Sullivan in 2016 on April Fool's Day, Thanks For All the Fish (2018)and OMG (2020). Another Words, a setting to music of the Trump/Raffensberger phone call of January 2021, was released in 2021, with an expanded version following in 2022.

Catalogue

References

External links
Radiant Future website

British record labels
Record labels established in 2000